Westbury is a station on the Long Island Rail Road's Main Line. All trains for the Port Jefferson Branch and Ronkonkoma Branch run through it, though only some trains on the Port Jefferson branch stop (and only a few on the Ronkonoma Branch do). It is located at Union and Post Avenues in Westbury, New York. It is 23.4 miles (37.7 km) from Penn Station. The station is fully wheelchair accessible. It has two side platforms and three tracks.

History

Westbury station was built sometime in March 1837 with the opening of the LIRR to Hicksville. The station was closed between June and September of the same year, briefly replaced by the nearby Carle Place station. Throughout much of the mid-19th Century, the J.P. Kelsey Branch Store served as the depot. The second station was built between April and June 1883. The third station was built in 1914, and was electrified in October 1970, along with the rest of the Port Jefferson Branch between Mineola and Huntington Stations. It had a major remodeling around 1972, and another one sometime between 2001 and 2005. In 2000, a woman was stabbed to death in the underpass beneath the tracks.

On February 26, 2019, a local eastbound train to Hicksville collided with a truck at the School Street railroad crossing just east of the station as it was accelerating out of the station. A few seconds after that collision, a westbound Ronkonkoma Branch express train headed for Penn Station collided with the already slammed truck at the crossing and derailed past it, slamming into the Westbound platform's eastern end. The collision caused extensive damage to both the Westbound platform (easternmost two car lengths), and LIRR M7 train car #7425, killing the three occupants of the truck, and causing a few power poles to be replaced. The crossing was eliminated as part of the Third Track Project between May and November 2020 and replaced with an underpass.

Post Avenue Bridge replacement

The station is located next to a bridge over Post Avenue that had an  clearance that was installed during the 1914 rebuild. The bridge was hit by between five and nine high trucks per year between 2010 and 2016, causing numerous train delays in both directions. In October 2017, the LIRR replaced the old bridge with a new bridge. Despite the fact that the previous bridge was 103 years old, it was still considered to be in good condition. However, the bridge had to be replaced in preparation for the LIRR third track project; the new span had a  clearance and a capacity of three tracks.

Station enhancements 
Also as part of the third track project, the Westbury station will be upgraded to accommodate full-length 12-car trains. Both platforms would be replaced, and Platform B will be relocated. Canopies, benches, signage, and security cameras will be installed. The station, which is already compliant with the Americans with Disabilities Act of 1990, would be made more accessible via the installation of elevators and ramps, as well as a new overpass. Amenities such as Wi-Fi, USB charging stations, artwork, and digital information displays would be included in the renovation. The electrical substation at Westbury station will be replaced to make way for the third track, and a parking garage would be installed north of the station. The village of Westbury wants to redevelop the land south of the station.

Station layout
This station has two high-level side platforms, each 12 cars long. During rush hours, trains will stop at both platforms in the peak direction. Most Ronkonkoma Branch trains, some Port Jefferson Branch trains, and all Montauk Branch trains pass through the station without stopping.

References

External links 

Unofficial LIRR History Website
North Side on Union Avenue
South Side with tunnel at Railroad Avenue parking lot
Platforms looking eastbound and westbound
Old Westury Station with Shelter and Freight House (TrainsAreFun.com)
 Post Avenue entrance from Google Maps Street View
 Station House on Union Avenue from Google Maps Street View
 Inside Station House from Google Maps Street View
 Platforms from Google Maps Street View

Long Island Rail Road stations in Nassau County, New York
Railway stations in the United States opened in 1837